In Māori legend, Taranaki is a mountain being that lived peacefully for many centuries in the centre of Aotearoa's Te Ika-a-Māui with four other mountains. Of the four mountains Tongariro, Ngauruhoe and Ruapehu were still fighting. 

Nearby stood Mount Pihanga. Covered in a cloak of deep green forest she presented a stunning sight and all the mountain gods were in love with her.

Taranaki dared to make advances to Pihanga and was reproached by Tongariro and a mighty battle ensued between them. The earth shook and the sky became dark as the mountains belched forth their anger. When the battle ended the lovely Pihanga stood close by Tongariro's side. Taranaki, wild with grief and jealously, angrily wrenched his roots from the ground and left the other mountains.

Weeping, he plunged towards the setting sun, gouging out a deep wide trench. When he reached the sea he turned north and stumbled up the coast. As he slept that night the Pouakai Ranges snared and trapped Taranaki in the place he now rests.

The next day a stream of clear water sprang from the side of Tongariro. It flowed down the deep scar Taranaki had left on his journey to the coast to form the Whanganui River.

There are those who say that Taranaki is silently brooding and will one day try to return inland again to fight Tongariro. Consequently, many Māori were wary of living in the area between the mountains.

References

Māori mythology